Daw Meskine is a French Imam and Secretary General of the French Council for Imams

Life as Imam

Daw Meskine is the imam of the Clichy-Sous-Bois mosque and the secretary general of the French Council of Imams.

Career

Meskine has been treated as an important figure in Franco-Islamic relations and interior minister Nicolas Sarkozy who has apparently consulted him in the past.

Arrest and controversy

On June 19, 2006 it was announced Imam Meskine and his son were arrested for laundering money linked to a terrorist organization. Many members of the French Islamic community saw the arrest as a provocation meant to interfere with state funding to the al-Najah Muslim High school. Some have linked the event to his criticism of the policies of Nicholas Sarkozy.

17 other French citizens have been arrested in the operation.

Sources
Islam Online article before scandal
Islam Online article after arrest
American blog where the arrest was discussed
news story on June, 20,2006 
Expatica article on the raids

References

French imams
Living people
Year of birth missing (living people)